is a 2017 Japanese yakuza film directed by Takeshi Kitano, starring Kitano (a.k.a. "Beat Takeshi"), and was released in Japan on 7 October 2017. It is a sequel to Kitano's 2012 film, Beyond Outrage, and completes Kitano's Outrage trilogy started in 2010. It received its premiere when it was screened out of competition at the 74th Venice International Film Festival.

Plot summary
The movie opens up with a scene of two ordinary-looking men, Otomo and his right-hand man Ichikawa fishing off the resort island of Jeju in South Korea.  Later on that night Otomo is chauffeured to a nightclub full of prostitutes.  He is treated with the utmost respect by all thus identifying him as the chief.  He soon receives a call from a customer at a hotel with a service complaint.  Otomo and a team of men go to meet the customer and encounter a henchman beating up on two of his prostitutes in a hotel living room.  Otomo is told that the two prostitutes were non-compliant with their boss, Hanada of the Hanabishi family, the Yakuza family that controls most of Japan.  When they go in to talk to him in the bedroom they find him on the bed littered with S&M toys.  When Otomo asks for compensation for having hurt the girls Hanada angrily and disrespectfully threatens him.  However, only after Otomo's men all show that they are armed and more than willing to shoot him, does Hanada calm down, and softly asks how much should he pay, Otomo tells him to consider the damage and offense he has caused and to pay them accordingly the next day.  It is Hanada who blurts out 2 million yen that that amount is finalized.  However, Hanada reneges on his promise to pay and has Otomo's man killed when he tries to pick-up the money the next day.

When Hanada, now back in Tokyo, describes the incident to Nakata his boss, the seriousness of his actions are given consideration once they identify that Otomo and the man Hanada had killed belong to Mr. Chang, a fixer who also owns a multinational criminal organization.  Nakata offers to mediate the matter for Hanada by meeting with Mr. Chang, intending to settle the situation with 30 million yen as an offering of peace. However, Mr. Chang refuses the 30 million yen, and curiously gives them another 30 million yen to take with them once they leave.

Nakata and Hanada are puzzled by Mr. Chang's gesture until their boss Nishino, the second in command of the Hanabishi clan, mistakenly explains that their original offer of 30 million yen was not enough, and to show his displeasure and the insignificance of their offer Mr. Chang gave them an equal amount.  Nishino's explanation is proven wrong however when he meets Mr. Chang and presents him this time with 100 million yen. Mr. Chang refuses again and this time does not even take the time to give Nishino and Hanada the minimum courtesy of attending them nor their 100 million yen. It is clear that while the Hanabishi family are dealing with the situation in the standard way the Yakuza does, Chang does not.

While this is happening in the forefront, in the background the politics of the Hanabishi clan are in full display. The current clan chairman is an ex-stock-broker Nomura who assumed power of the clan because he was the brother-in-law of the old chairman. Nishino and Nakata have very little respect for him and want to take advantage of the Hanada-Otomo conflict in order to overthrow and eliminate Nomura, blaming it on the Chang organization in the process. Meanwhile, the Sanno clan (absorbed into the Hanabishi clan in the previous film) carefully assesses the situation and tries to take advantage for themselves.

Mr. Chang minimizes the conflict and settles the situation peacefully and wants Otomo to stand down from any retribution he is planning, while Hanada's men try to assassinate Mr. Chang, but fail. Being a former Sanno clan member and personally has conflict with the Hanabishi clan, Otomo decides to avenge the offense to him and Mr. Chang by traveling back to Japan and killing the Hanabishi responsible.

The conflict culminates in Otomo seeking out all the Hanabishi responsible and killing them all in insidious ways.  He did all this without Mr. Chang's approval, and consequently, he punishes himself by committing modern seppuku - shooting himself as punishment for his offense towards Mr. Chang, once again demonstrating his honor and loyalty.  Mr. Chang, when told of the news, reflects sadly while staring into the empty distance.

Cast
 Takeshi Kitano (Beat Takeshi) as Otomo
 Toshiyuki Nishida as Nishino
 Nao Ōmori as Ichikawa
 Pierre Taki as Hanada
 Yutaka Matsushige as Detective Shigeta 
 Ren Osugi Nomura
 Sansei Shiomi as Nakata
 Hakuryu as Lee
 Tatsuo Nadaka as Shirayama
 Ken Mitsuishi as Gomi
 Taizo Harada as Maruyama
 Hiroyuki Ikeuchi as Yoshioka
 Ittoku Kishibe as Morishima
 Hiro Honda as Mr. Chang's assistant
 Tokio Kaneda as Mr. Chang (Chang Dae-Sung)

Production
In September 2012, Takeshi Kitano said that the producers wanted him to make the third Outrage film.

At the premiere of the film during the 74th Venice International Film Festival Kitano recalled his previous positive experience in Venice at the 1997 festival where his film Hana-bi won the Golden Lion, following in the tradition of other Japanese films such as Rashomon which won the gold prize at the 1951 festival. Kitano stated about the new film that "there are various types of Yakuza... even if they are now disappearing. There are various kinds of humanity within these violent groups. Violence contrasts with some of the issues I dealt with in the past, but in this film there are people who are trying to take care of other people. The actions of the characters are influenced by what surrounds them, but I have to admit that I'm a little tired of devoting myself to violence, so I put many elements in the new film".

The film crew includes composer Keiichi Suzuki, cinematographer Katsumi Yanagijima, lighting designer Hitoshi Takaya, production designer Norihiro Isoda, sound designer Yoshifumi Kureishi, casting director Takefumi Yoshikawa, first assistant director Hirofumi Inaba and line producer Shinji Komiya.

Music
The soundtrack for the film was composed by Keiichi Suzuki who was described in a review as composing an "elliptical score, mixing electronics and jazz horns... sometimes almost subliminally placed in the sound mix, add(ing) an unsettling edge".

Release
On 9 September 2017, Outrage Coda received its premiere screening at the Venice Film Festival in Italy at the closing ceremonies as the final film screened out of competition. It received general release in Japan on 7 October.

Response

Box office
Outrage Coda grossed $8,836 in Russia and $12 million in Japan. For the opening week-end in Japan on 8 October 2017, the film opened as the number one film with a gate of $3.1 million. Further reception for the film is consistent with the two previous films in the Outrage trilogy, with the box-office performance of the second installment outpacing the first film in the trilogy based on international receipts.

Critical reception
On review aggregator Rotten Tomatoes, the film holds an approval rating of 60% based on 5 reviews, and an average rating of 7.5/10. On Metacritic, the film has a weighted average score of 58 out of 100, based on 4 critics, indicating "mixed or average reviews". In his positive review of the film for ScreenDaily, Jonathan Romney found the violence in the film to be extreme and the casting to be well matched to the plot: "Many viewers may balk at the fact that the film, taking its genre logic to an uncomfortable extreme, is an entirely male affair, with women relegated to walk-on prostitute roles. But Kitano does cast brilliantly in his selection of utterly unlikable males. Standing out are Taki as the brutish Hanada, Nishida as the gloating conniver Nishino, and Tokio Kaneda as Chang, whose fancy waistcoats and old-school hairstyle make him look like a cattle baron in a 70s Western".

Awards

References

External links
  
 
 

2017 films
Films directed by Takeshi Kitano
Yakuza films
2010s Japanese films